The Denmark Open is a darts tournament that has been held since 1973 in Denmark.

List of winners

Men's

Women's

Youth's

Girls

Tournament records
 Most wins 5:  John Lowe
 Most Finals 6:  John Lowe
 Most Semi Finals 6:  John Lowe
 Most Quarter Finals 6:  John Lowe,  Ronnie Baxter
 Most Appearances 26:  Kim F. Jensen
 Youngest Winner age 18:   Sebastian Białecki
 Oldest Winner age 47:  Scott Mitchell

References

1973 establishments in Denmark
Darts tournaments
Sports competitions in Denmark